Daviesia scoparia is a species of flowering plant in the family Fabaceae and is endemic to the south-west of Western Australia. It is a broom-like, glabrous, leafless shrub with yellow, dark reddish-brown and maroon flowers.

Description

Taxonomy
Daviesia scoparia was first formally described in 1995 by Michael Crisp in Australian Systematic Botany from specimens he collected near Borden in 1979. The specific epithet (scoparia) means "sweeper", referring to the broom-like habit of the plant.

Distribution and habitat
This daviesia grows in mallee-heath or woodland mainly between Corrigin, Katanning and Condingup in the Avon Wheatbelt, Coolgardie, Esperance Plains, Jarrah Forest and Mallee biogeographic regions of south-western Western Australia.

Conservation status 
Daviesia scoparia is listed as "not threatened" by the Government of Western Australia Department of Biodiversity, Conservation and Attractions.

References 

scoparia
Taxa named by Michael Crisp
Plants described in 1995
Flora of Western Australia